El Prat de Llobregat, commonly known as El Prat , is a municipality of Spain located in the comarca of Baix Llobregat in Catalonia. The Josep Tarradellas Barcelona–El Prat Airport largely lies within the municipal limits. It is part of the Barcelona metropolitan area.

Location 

It is situated in the delta of the Llobregat river on the right bank, bordering the coast of the Mediterranean Sea between Barcelona and Viladecans. More than a quarter of the area of the municipality is occupied by Barcelona–El Prat Airport. Apart from the transport links to the airport, the town of El Prat is served by a railway station on the coast line from Barcelona to Valencia. The municipality also has a beach and a small nature reserve at the Llac (Lake) de la Ricarda i del Remolar. El Prat is famous for its blue-legged chickens (known as gall potablava in Catalan). El Prat forms part of the metropolitan area of Barcelona.

History 
El Prat was founded between the years 1720 and 1740, when the town started to grow besides a path crossing. The first buildings to appear were the church (dedicated to St. Peter and St. Paul), the hostel (which served as a school, bakery, and obviously as a hostel), and some other houses built by the farmers of the delta, who came to the church to pray.

After this, the installation of a ferry to cross the river and, later, the construction of the Ferran Puig bridge, the arrival of the railroad and the discovery of underground water improved the communication of El Prat and consequently doubled its population. In 1917, the installation on the town of La Papelera Espanola, a factory producing paper and derivatives, started the industrial years of El Prat.

Next, in 1923, three private aerodromes started operations in El Prat, due to the flat terrain of the municipality. That was the beginning of the connection between El Prat and the world of aviation, that would end up creating Barcelona International Airport after the unification of the three aerodromes in 1948.

In 1926, another company, this time of the textile sector, called "La Seda de Barcelona", built a factory in the town. That caused the final spurt of growth of El Prat. With the immigration of people from the south of Spain (mostly Andalusia and Extremadura), the town almost doubled in size by 1930, and again by 1950, and then increased its size threefold in 1970 with the creation of the neighborhoods of Sant Cosme, Sant Jordi and La Granja, built to be the home of these immigrants. Finally, with the next expansion, the population doubled in size once again, although has now reached a period of stability.

Demography

Climate

Economy

At El Prat De Llobregat stands the Gearbox del Prat plant, fully owned by the Spanish car maker SEAT, which is one of the five production sites in the world manufacturing transmission parts and gearboxes for the Volkswagen Group.
Also Vueling Airlines has its head office in the Parque de Negocios Mas Blau II in El Prat de Llobregat. Before its dissolution, Clickair had its head office in El Prat de Llobregat.

Schools and education 
Public centers in El Prat de Llobregat

Preschool 
 Sol Solet
 Dumbo
 El Cabusset
 La Vailets
 El Xumet del Prat
 Llar d'infants Hello Kitty

Kindergarten and primary education (CEIP) 
 Joan Maragall
 Escola Mare de Déu del Carme 
 Jacint Verdaguer
 Charles Darwin
 Josep Tarradellas
 Sant Cosme i Sant Damià
 Bernat Metge
 Escola del Parc
 Galileo Galilei
 Sant Jaume
 Jaume Balmes
 Pompeu Fabra
 Ramón Llull
Private schools (primary education and secondary education )
 Col·legi Seda 
 Acadèmia Nuestra Señora del Mar García-Lorca 
 Escola Mare de Déu del Carme

Secondary education and baccalaureate (INS)
 Estany de la Ricarda
 Baldiri Guilera
 Salvador Dalí
 Doctor Trueta
 Illa dels Banyols 
 Institut Ribera Baixa

Special education center (CEE)
 Can Rigol

Adult schools(EPA)
 Sant Cosme
 Terra Baixa

See also

 Metropolitan area of Barcelona
 Zona Franca (Barcelona)

References

 Panareda Clopés, Josep Maria; Rios Calvet, Jaume; Rabella Vives, Josep Maria (1989). Guia de Catalunya, Barcelona: Caixa de Catalunya.  (Spanish).  (Catalan).

External links
 Artistic and historical buildings in Prat de Llobregat (in Catalan)
 El Prat City Council (in Catalan)
 Government data pages 

 
Populated places in Baix Llobregat